Peristrophe was a genus of up to 40 species of flowering plants: that are now usually considered synonyms in the genus Dicliptera Juss.

Species remain part of the family Acanthaceae and tribe Justicieae, native to warm temperate to tropical regions of Africa and Asia. The species are shrubs or herbaceous plants, with two-lipped flowers.

Selected species

References

Acanthaceae
Acanthaceae genera
Flora of Pakistan
Flora of Indo-China